Sebastiano Vassalli (24 October 1941 – 26 July 2015) was an Italian author. He wrote the 2007 novel The Italian (L'italiano).

Vassalli was born in Genoa, Italy in 1941. His mother are from Tuscany and father were from Lombardy. At a very young age, he was abandoned to relatives in Novara for some flour and oil. He went on to complete his Bachelor of arts degree in Milan. Soon after, Vassalli partnered with Cesare Musatti and wrote a book on Psychoanalysis and Contemporary Art which ultimately began his career as a notable author.

Vassalli devoted himself to teaching and researching artistic Neoavanguardia and was also involved with the Gruppo 63. He was a very dedicated man especially when it came to writing. He wrote for La Repubblica, La Stampa and Corriere della Sera.

Vassalli's works are established based on historical research relating to the evolution of religion, politics, and gender differences. His novels are normally set in a certain historical context (Italy in the sixties, the middle ages, and times of counter-fascism). He devotes his works around realistic representations of characters.

Vassalli's works are known for their ability to represent the extremely simple yet effective nature of the characters of the novels in a sort of fictional manner. This aspect, together with historical accuracy gives Vassalli’s works valuable qualities in terms of teaching them.

Literary works 
 
    
    
     
    
    
     
    
    
    
    
    
    
    
    
 Cuore de pietra. 1996.   
Un infinito numero. 1998.

Other works 

 Un nulla pieno di storie. 2010.

References 

•"Italian Literature : Fiction at the Turn of the 21st Century." Encyclopædia Britannica Online. Encyclopædia Britannica, n.d. Web. 29 May 2013.

Italian male novelists
Writers from Genoa
1941 births
2015 deaths
20th-century Italian novelists
20th-century Italian male writers
21st-century Italian novelists
21st-century Italian male writers
Gruppo 63